Sáros (-Hungarian, Slovak: Šariš, Latin: comitatus Sarossiensis, German: Scharosch) was an administrative county (comitatus) of the Kingdom of Hungary. Its territory is now in northeastern Slovakia. Today, Šariš is only an informal designation of the corresponding territory.

Geography

Sáros county shared borders with the Austrian crownland Galicia and the Hungarian counties Szepes, Abaúj-Torna and Zemplén. It was situated between the Levoča Hills (i.e., Szepesség (Spiš)), Kassa and Felső-Szvidnyik. The river Tarca flowed through the county. Its area was 3,652 km2 around 1910.

Capitals
The capital of Sáros county was Sáros Castle. After various other towns, since 1647 the capital has been Eperjes.

History
Sáros county was created in the 13th century from the comitatus Novi Castri (Újvár County, named after Novum Castrum, today Abaújvár) which included also the territories of the later counties of Abaúj and Heves.

In the aftermath of World War I, most of Sáros county became part of newly formed Czechoslovakia, as recognized by the concerned states in the 1920 Treaty of Trianon. During World War II, when Czechoslovakia was divided, Šariš became part of the First Slovak Republic. Since 1993, Šariš has been part of Slovakia, located in the Prešov Region. Historically a prosperous region, it is nowadays relatively poor.

Demographics

Subdivisions

In the early 20th century, the subdivisions of Sáros county were:

Notes

References

Counties in the Kingdom of Hungary